List of mobile telephone prefixes by country

International prefixes table

See also 
 List of country calling codes

Notes

References 
https://www.thedailystar.net/business/telecom/mnp-service-in-bangladesh-use-any-mobile-operator-keeping-same-number-1641148

International telecommunications
Telephone numbers
 Prefixes
Lists by country
Telecommunications lists